Stand for Something: The Battle for America's Soul is a 2006 book by Ohio Governor John Kasich.

Summary
In Stand for Something, Kasich argues that America can recover its shared values of personal responsibility, honesty, accountability and integrity if each of us acts to "set right the moral pendulum in our own lives."

Kasich criticizes politicians who are more interested in getting reelected than in serving the public good. Among the political leaders he admires for pursuing the public good are civil rights activist Martin Luther King Jr. and presidents Franklin D. Roosevelt and Ronald Reagan, each of whom he views as inspiring people "to do better in their own lives."

The book includes descriptions of his working-class childhood in McKees Rocks, Pennsylvania, the son of a letter carrier.  He discloses to his readers that although he served as an altar boy in his childhood parish, he liked girls "too much" to seriously contemplate entering the priesthood.

References

2006 non-fiction books
Political memoirs
Books by John Kasich